The Cape River is a river of New Zealand. A tributary of the Opouawe River, it is located in the Wairarapa in the southern North Island.

See also
List of rivers of New Zealand

References

Rivers of the Wellington Region
Rivers of New Zealand